Progressive Governors Forum is a forum of governors elected on the platform of the All Progressives Congress (APC), the mega party which was born of a merger between the Action Congress of Nigeria (ACN), the All Nigeria Peoples Party (ANPP), the Congress for Progressive Change (CPC), and faction of the All Progressives Grand Alliance (APGA). The Forum was formed in the wake of the merger of legacy parties which merged to form the APC and at inception in August 2013, the PGF had 11 member governors comprising Borno, Edo, Ekiti, Imo, Lagos, Nassarawa, Ogun, Osun, Oyo, Yobe, and Zamfara states; this number increased later when five additional governors from the ruling People’s Democratic Party (PDP) defected to the APC after a crisis that gave rise to a faction known as the new-PDP.

Sequel to the new merger with members from the new-PDP, the PGF comprised sixteen governors (Adamawa, Borno, Edo, Ekiti, Imo, Kano, Kwara, Lagos, Nasarawa, Ogun, Oyo, Osun, Rivers, Sokoto, Yobe and Zamfara states), this number, however, reduced to fourteen after Ekiti's Kayode Fayemi lost his re-election bid and Adamawa's Murtala Nyako was impeached, in June and July 2014 respectively.

The APC recorded overwhelming victory in most states and the number of member governors increased to 22 after the 2015 gubernatorial elections. The Forum member states presently total 20 as at January 2020.

Aims and Objectives
Addressing newsmen in October, 2013, the governors of the All Progressive Congress, APC, described their main goal as organising all APC state governments in order to implement policies which would develop human capital in their respective states and improve the quality of life through job creation, which would, in turn, eradicate poverty. 
The objectives of the Forum include;
 Promoting the APC’s social democratic ideals as enshrined in the party’s constitution and manifesto by undertaking policy actions which reflect these in APC-governed states 
 Partnering with other progressive governors in Nigeria, irrespective of whether or not they are members of the APC, in order to promote good governance and deepen the democratic process in the country. 
 Setting a uniform agenda especially with respect to healthcare and education across all APC states, with the aim of establishing and replicating results across board 
 Carrying out initiatives which would make the electioneering process credible and that results truly reflect the wishes of the people 
 To support the party, the APC, in engaging other stakeholders with the aim of strengthening democracy and accountability in government 
 To support the party in its leadership orientation efforts across the country 
 To implement initiatives which would aid the development of the Nigeria Governors Forum (NGF), and enable it take its rightful place as a democratic institution not prone to partisan influences.

Principles
The PGF is founded upon principles which include being social democratic, people-oriented, leading with accountability and being responsive to the needs of the people.

Structure
Members of the PGF meet monthly, with meetings sometimes rotated among states governed by APC Governors while a secretariat in charge of the Forum’s day-to-day activities is run by a Director-General. This secretariat is saddled with the responsibility of implementing the decisions reached by the governors from member states and generating programmes, proposals and recommendations for consideration by the governors.

The current Chairman of the PGF is Abubakar Atiku Bagudu, Governor of Kebbi State who was elected as Forum Chair in May 2019. https://www.dailytrust.com.ng/bagudu-emerges-chairman-apc-govs-forum.html

The Secretariat
The Director-General of the PGF since its inception in August 2013 is Mallam Salihu Lukman, a development economist.

Departments at the PGF include the Finance and Administrative department, the Programs Department – which is further broken into the Governance Program Unit and the Legislative Program Unit, and the Media & Communications Department.

Members

Current members 
The PGF is made up of governors on the platform of the ruling party, APC. Members are as follows;
 Babagana Umara Zulum
 Kayode Fayemi 
 Muhammad Inuwa Yahaya
 Hope Uzodinma
 Badaru Abubakar
 Nasir Ahmad El-Rufai
 Abdullahi Umar Ganduje
 Aminu Bello Masari
 Abubakar Atiku Bagudu
 Yahaya Bello
 Abdulrahman Abdulrazaq
 Babajide Sanwo-Olu 
Abdullahi A. Sule
 Abubakar Sani Bello
Rotimi Akeredolu
 Dapo Abiodun 
Adegboyega Oyetola
Simon Lalong
 Mai Mala Buni

Events and Activities

First Progressive Governance Lecture
On 24 February 2014, the Progressive Governors converged in Ibadan, Oyo State, for the first Progressive Governance Lecture, which was tagged "Unemployment and the Crisis of Governance in Nigeria: The Way Forward". The aim of the lecture was to examine the unemployment crisis in Nigeria in order to proffer solutions which would result in mass job creation.

At the event, the governors stated that they would work on recommendations gathered in order to help direct policy formulation and implementation within APC states.

Progressive Governors/Legislators/CSOs Roundtable
On Monday, 24 March 2014, the PGF held a roundtable session with legislators within the APC and select Civil Society Organisations. The theme of the roundtable session was ‘Improving governance through transparent budgeting, accountability and effective public financial management'. The event was chaired by the Rivers State governor, Rotimi Amaechi, and some of the issues it was convened to tackle include the lack of transparency and accountability in budget implementation, budget and budget process in the National Assembly, the role of public finance management in good governance, and the 20 billion Dollars reported missing in the Nigerian National Petroleum Commission (NNPC).

A communiqué was issued and some of the recommendations made include establishing a budget timetable in order to ensure that the budgeting process is not dependent upon the Federal Government, strengthening institutions in order to promote accountability in budgeting, designing the budgeting process based on sector plans and not statements of intended expenses (as is currently being done) and making provisions for a closing figure for the previous year before presenting a new budget, among others.

Second Progressive Governance Lecture
Sequel to the first Progressive Governance Lecture, a second lecture took place in Kano State in May 2014, titled: "Crisis in Nigeria’s Education: Addressing the Connect between Unemployment and Insecurity". At this event, the host, Governor Kwankwaso of Kano State, elucidated on the steps being taken by his administration to reduce the spate of crime by encouraging youths to become educated. This, he said, had been achieved through a free education programme in the state. The Chairman of the PGF, Governor Rochas Okorocha, also asked that politicians work together to combat the scourge of terrorism irrespective of party affiliation.

Visit and Donation to Victims of Nyanya Bomb Blast
The PGF had, after a terrorist attack in Nyanya, a suburb on the outskirts of Abuja on 14 April 2014, paid visits to victims in the National Hospital, Abuja, and the Asokoro General Hospital and donated a relief fund of N100million.

Workshop on Education Policy Design
Following deliberations at the first and second Progressive Governance Lectures, this workshop was organised in Port-Harcourt in July 2014 for the purpose of designing policies which would aid educational development in APC states. In attendance were commissioners of education from at least 13 of the 16 APC states and some deputy governors, among other state officials.

The APC Governors' Retreat
The PGF, before the inauguration of the new administration in May, 2015, organised a retreat for all APC governors (both returning and outgoing) and governors-elect. The aim of the retreat was to design governance strategies which would enable them deliver on the party's campaign promises, and to provide the incoming governors with the necessary knowledge on governance and administrative duties.

See also
All Progressives Congress (APC)

List of State Governors in Nigeria

External links
 PGF official website
 Official website of the All Progressives Congress (APC)

References

1999
State governors
Political organizations based in Nigeria